Aalborg Business College is a business college located in Aalborg, Northern Jutland, Denmark.

External links 

Education in Aalborg